Diego Renan de Lima Ferreira (born 26 January 1990), known as Diego Renan, is a Brazilian footballer who plays for CSA as a full back.

Career 
Born in Surubim, Pernambuco, Diego Renan made his professional debut for Cruzeiro in a 1-1 away draw to Ituiutaba in the Campeonato Mineiro on March 27, 2008.

On 4 January 2017, after the expiration of his contract with Cruzeiro, Diego Renan signed with Chapecoense

Career statistics

Honours 
Cruzeiro
 Campeonato Mineiro: 2008, 2009, 2011

Criciúma
 Campeonato Catarinense: 2013

Vitória
Campeonato Baiano: 2016

Chapecoense 
Campeonato Catarinense: 2017

Figueirense
Campeonato Catarinense: 2018

Avaí
Campeonato Catarinense: 2021

References

External links

1990 births
Living people
Sportspeople from Pernambuco
Brazilian footballers
Association football defenders
Campeonato Brasileiro Série A players
Campeonato Brasileiro Série B players
Cruzeiro Esporte Clube players
Criciúma Esporte Clube players
CR Vasco da Gama players
Esporte Clube Vitória players
Associação Chapecoense de Futebol players
Figueirense FC players
Associação Atlética Ponte Preta players
Centro Sportivo Alagoano players
Avaí FC players